Laurie Sanborn is an American politician in the state of New Hampshire. She is a member of the New Hampshire House of Representatives, sitting as a Republican from the Hillsborough 41 district, having been first elected in 2012. Sanborn has been a Deputy Majority Leader since December 2, 2020. Sanborn served in the House previously, representing Merrimack 5 from 2010 until her resignation on June 5, 2012.

References 

21st-century American politicians
Living people
Republican Party members of the New Hampshire House of Representatives
Year of birth missing (living people)